Geo Saizescu (14 November 1932 – 23 September 2013) was a Romanian actor and film director. He appeared in 22 films between 1963 and 2009 and directed 16 films between 1953 and 2006.

Selected filmography
 A Bomb Was Stolen (1961)
 Tonight We'll Dance at Home (1972)
 The Pale Light of Sorrow (1981)
 The Secret of Bacchus (1984)

References

External links

1932 births
2013 deaths
People from Mehedinți County
Romanian male film actors
Romanian film directors